John Henry Lienhard V (born 1961) is the Abdul Latif Jameel Professor of Water and Mechanical Engineering at the Massachusetts Institute of Technology. His research focuses on desalination, heat transfer, and thermodynamics.  He has also written several engineering textbooks.

Childhood and education
Lienhard was born in  1961 in Pullman, Washington, where his father, John H. Lienhard IV, was a professor at Washington State University.  His mother, Carol Ann Bratton, a violinist, was a member of the Washington State University String Quartet. The family moved to Lexington, Kentucky in 1967 when his father took a position at the University of Kentucky. Lienhard attended primary school and high school in Lexington.

Lienhard enrolled at the University of Kentucky when he was 16. He completed his bachelor's degree in engineering, summa cum laude, at the University of California, Los Angeles in 1982, and he took his master's degree in heat and mass transfer at UCLA in 1984 for research on Rayleigh–Bénard instability.
He then transferred to the University of California, San Diego, where he wrote his doctoral dissertation on wind tunnel measurements of strongly stratified turbulent flow, finishing in 1988. Lienhard's doctoral experiments encompassed Brunt–Väisälä frequencies up to 2.4 s−1 and required the development of hot-wire anemometry usable in the presence of large temperature fluctuations.

Career
Lienhard joined the mechanical engineering faculty of the Massachusetts Institute of Technology in 1988, immediately after graduating from UCSD. He has spent his entire professional career at MIT.

Lienhard's initial research at MIT focused on cooling by liquid jet impingement. This work included fundamental convection problems, droplet splattering, free-surface turbulence interactions, and pattern-formation in the hydraulic jump.
The thin boundary layer at a jet's stagnation point also provided an attractive avenue to high heat flux engineering. In 1993, Lienhard's group reported the highest
steady state fluxes to that date removed from a macroscopic area, achieved using a high speed water jet (≈40 kW/cm2). They later extended this approach to arrays of jets, allowing larger areas to be cooled at high flux. In 1998, they used a water jet array at 46 m/s to remove 1.7 kW/cm2 by convection alone over areas of several cm2.

In the 2000s, Lienhard refocused his research on the problem of clean water supply and scarcity, particularly around desalination technologies. He approached this area through his background in thermal engineering and transport phenomena, making energy efficiency a central aim.
His group's desalination research has spanned a broad range of topics including humidification-dehumidification,
forward and reverse osmosis, membrane distillation,
produced water, 
electrodialysis, nanofiltration, solar desalination,
and thermophysical properties.

The seawater thermophysical property database developed by his group has been widely used by other researchers.

Lienhard has written hundreds of peer-reviewed research publications and has been issued more than 35 US patents. The patents have facilitated several start-up companies formed by his former students.

Lienhard has been responsible for launching a number of major research programs at MIT. He was the founding director of the Center for Clean Water and Clean
Energy (2008–2017), a multi-million dollar research collaboration with King Fahd University of Petroleum and Minerals (KFUPM) involving dozens of faculty members at KFUPM and MIT.
He was the founding director of the Ibn Khaldun Fellowship program for Saudi Arabian Women,
which has brought dozens of PhD-level women to MIT for research collaborations. He is also the founding director of the Abdul Latif Jameel Water and Food Systems Lab (J-WAFS) at MIT.
J-WAFS funds diverse research on water and food, across all of MIT's schools, to address the needs of a rapidly growing population on a changing planet.

Lienhard is a committed educator, recognized with awards for teaching and mentoring.  He has written textbooks on measurement and instrumentation, on heat transfer, and on thermal modeling. He has long collaborated with his father on A Heat Transfer Textbook.  In 2001, they made the decision to distribute the work primarily as an ebook, one of the first textbooks to adopt this format. The ebook, which is free of charge, has since been downloaded hundreds of thousands of times across the world.

Selected awards and honors
Lienhard has received a number of honors and awards, including the following:

 Donald Q. Kern Award of the American Institute of Chemical Engineers (AIChE), 2022
 Fellow of the American Society of Thermal and Fluid Engineers, elected in 2021
 Edward F. Obert Award of the American Society of Mechanical Engineers (ASME), November 2019
 Chief Guest (commencement speaker) of the Convocation of the Indian Institute of Technology Ropar, December 2018
 Fellow of the American Association for the Advancement of Science (AAAS), elected in 2018
 John R. Freeman Lecturer, Boston Society of Civil Engineers, 2016
 Heat Transfer Memorial Award of the American Society of Mechanical Engineers (ASME), November 2015
 Technical Communities Globalization Medal of the American Society of Mechanical Engineers (ASME), November 2012

 J. P. Den Hartog Distinguished Educator Award of MIT, 2003
 Fellow of the American Society of Mechanical Engineers (ASME), elected in 2000

 Ralph R. Teetor Educational Award, Society of Automotive Engineers (SAE), 1992
 Presidential Young Investigator Award, US National Science Foundation, 1988

In addition, Lienhard's research group has received many best paper, poster, and presentation awards for their work in desalination and heat transfer.

Textbooks

 Thomas G. Beckwith, Roy D. Marangoni, and John H. Lienhard Mechanical Measurements, 5th edition, Addison-Wesley, Reading MA, 1993.

 John H. Lienhard, IV and John H. Lienhard, V A heat transfer textbook, 3rd edition, Phlogiston Press, Cambridge, MA, 2001.

 Thomas G. Beckwith, Roy D. Marangoni, and John H. Lienhard Mechanical Measurements, 6th edition, Prentice-Hall, Upper Saddle River NJ, 2007.

 John H. Lienhard, IV and John H. Lienhard, V A heat transfer textbook, 4th edition, Dover Publications, Mineola NY, 2011.

 Leon R. Glicksman and John H. Lienhard, V Modeling and approximation in heat transfer, Cambridge University Press, Cambridge, 2016.

 John H. Lienhard, IV and John H. Lienhard, V A heat transfer textbook, 5th edition, Dover Publications, Mineola NY, 2019.

References

External links 
 MIT MechE People: John Lienhard
A Heat Transfer Textbook, 5/e, free ebook.
 Abdul Latif Jameel Water & Food Systems Lab

Living people
1961 births
People from Pullman, Washington
People from Lexington, Kentucky
University of California, Los Angeles alumni
University of California, San Diego alumni
MIT School of Engineering faculty
American mechanical engineers
Fellows of the American Society of Mechanical Engineers
Fellows of the American Association for the Advancement of Science
Thermodynamicists